Fatma Saliha Sultan ("who abstain one and "devoutus one"; 10 August 1862 – 1941) was an Ottoman princess, the daughter of Ottoman Sultan Abdulaziz and Dürrinev Kadın.

Early life
Saliha Sultan was born on 10 August 1862 in at the Dolmabahçe Palace.  Her father was Sultan Abdulaziz, son of Mahmud II and Pertevniyal Sultan, and her mother was Dürrinev Kadın, the daughter of Prince Mahmud Dziapş-lpa and Princess Halime Çikotua. She was the eldest daughter of her father and the second child of her mother. She was the younger full sister of crown prince Şehzade Yusuf Izzeddin and the elder sister of Şehzade Mehmed Selim, died at the age of one 

In 1869, she met with the Princess of Wales Alexandra of Denmark, when the latter visited Istanbul with her husband Prince of Wales Edward (future Edward VII).

Her father, Abdülaziz was deposed by his ministers on 30 May 1876, his nephew Murad V became the Sultan. He was transferred to Feriye Palace the next day. Her mother, and other women of Abdülaziz's entourage didn't wanted to leave the Dolmabahçe Palace. So they were grabbed by hand and were send out to the Feriye Palace. In the process, they were searched from head to toe and everything of value was taken from them. On 4 June 1876, Abdülaziz died under mysterious circumstances.

Saliha Sultan, a fourteen-year-old girl, continued to live in the Feriye Palace with her mother and nineteen-year-old brother.

Marriage
In 1875, Saliha Sultan was engaged to Ibrahim Hilmi Pasha, the son of Khedive of Egypt Ismail Pasha. However, the engagement was broken off, after the dismissal of her father in 1876.

In 1889 Sultan Abdul Hamid II arranged her trousseaux and marriage together with her two sisters, princesses Nazime Sultan and Esma Sultan, as well his own daughter Zekiye Sultan. She married Ahmed Zülkefil Pasha, the son of Kurdzade Ismail Hakkı Pasha on 20 April 1889 in the Yıldız Palace. 

The couple were given a waterfront palace located in Fındıklı. The two together had a daughter named Kamile Hanımsultan, born in 1890 and died in 1896 at the age of six.

Following the imperial family was sent to exile in 1924, Saliha and her husband settled in Cairo, Egypt, were they lived in poverty.

Death
Saliha Sultan died in 1941 at age of about seventy nine in Cairo, Egypt, and was buried in the mausoleum of Khedive Tewfik. Her husband died the same year.

Honours

 Order of the House of Osman
 Order of the Medjidie, Jeweled
 Order of Charity, 1st Class

Issue

Ancestry

References

Sources

 
 

1862 births
1941 deaths
Royalty from Istanbul
19th-century Ottoman princesses